Sincerely is the fourth studio album by the American country music group The Forester Sisters. It was released in 1988 via Warner Records Nashville.

Content
Three singles charted from the album: "Letter Home", the title track, and "Love Will". These all made top-ten on the Hot Country Songs charts in 1988.

"These Lips Don't Know How to Say Goodbye" was later a top-ten hit for Doug Stone in 1991.

Critical reception
Rating it 4 out of 5 stars, Jan Walker of The Orlando Sentinel said that "there's a confident sound to each of the 10 songs on the album, a showcase for the seemingly effortless natural harmony of four sibling voices." William Ruhlmann of AllMusic reviewed the album with favor as well, stating that "Already the possessors of a wonderful vocal harmony style, The Foresters hit a peak when they hooked up with writer/producer Wendy Waldman for this album, cutting her 'Letter Home' and other strong material".

Track listing

Chart performance

References

1988 albums
The Forester Sisters albums
albums produced by Wendy Waldman
albums produced by Jim Ed Norman
albums produced by Barry Beckett
albums produced by James Stroud
Warner Records albums
Country albums by American artists